The Carolina Challenge Cup is a four-team round robin pre-season competition hosted by the Charleston Battery. It was started in 2004 and features teams from Major League Soccer and the United Soccer Leagues. The 2010 Carolina Challenge Cup was contested among Charleston Battery, D.C. United, Real Salt Lake and Toronto FC, with D.C. United emerging as champions.

Teams
Four clubs competed in the tournament:

Standings

Matches

Scorers
5 goals
Jaime Moreno (D.C. United)
2 goals
Fabian Espindola (Real Salt Lake)
Robbie Findley (Real Salt Lake)
1 goal
Pierre-Rudolph Mayard (Charleston Battery)
Alvaro Saborio (Real Salt Lake)

See also
2010 in American soccer

External links
 Real Salt Lake, DC United and Toronto FC join the Battery in 2010 Carolina Challenge Cup
 2010 Carolina Challenge Cup set: Battery to host DC, Toronto and MLS Cup champ RSL

2010
Carolina
Carolina
2010 in sports in South Carolina
March 2010 sports events in the United States

it:Carolina Challenge Cup#2010